Brass is a 1923 American silent romantic drama film produced and distributed by Warner Bros. It was directed by Sidney A. Franklin. This movie stars Monte Blue, Marie Prevost, and Irene Rich. The well-regarded film survives in 16mm format.

Plot
As described in a film magazine review, a young man born in the country leaves his family farm to engage in business in the city. He marries for the first time when he is still very young, finds the match a failure, gets a divorce, and starts life again. The hopelessness of life as far as a happy marriage is concerned forces itself on the young man, whose only brief period of happiness was enjoyed when he was living with a woman who really loves him and sacrifices for him.

Cast

Box office
According to Warner Bros records the film earned $451,000 domestically and $28,000 in foreign markets.

Preservation status
Brass survives complete. It was transferred onto 16mm film by Associated Artists Productions in the 1950s and shown on television.

References

External links

1923 films
American silent feature films
Films directed by Sidney Franklin
1920s romance films
Films produced by Harry Rapf
American black-and-white films
American romance films
1920s American films